Sleepers or The Sleepers may refer to:

 The plural form of any type of sleeper


Film and television
 Sleepers (film), a 1996 American crime film
 Sleepers (TV series), a 1991 British comedy-drama series
 The Sleepers (TV series), a 2019 Czech drama series
 , a 2017–2018 Russian miniseries
 "Sleepers" (Sanctuary), a 2009 episode of Sanctuary
 Sleepers, extraterrestrials in the American television series The Event

Music
 The Sleepers (Chicago band), an American rock band formed in 2002
 The Sleepers (San Francisco band), a punk/post-punk band active from 1978 until 1981
 Sleepers (album), a solo album from rapper Big Pooh

Other
 Le Sommeil (The Sleepers), an 1866 painting by Gustave Courbet
 "The Sleepers" (poem), by Walt Whitman
 Sleepers, the 1995 Lorenzo Carcaterra novel on which the film is based
 The Sleepers (New Hampshire), a pair of mountain peaks in the United States
 Seven Sleepers, in Christian and Islamic medieval folklore a group of youths who hid to escape ancient Roman persecution of Christians

See also
 Sleeper (disambiguation)